The list of shipwrecks in 1798 includes ships sunk, foundered, wrecked, grounded or otherwise lost during 1798.

January

5 January

23 January

Unknown date

February

3 February

17 February

25 February

Unknown date

March

7 March

Unknown date

April

4 April

5 April

11 April

12 April

20 April

26 April

Unknown date

May

23 May

Unknown date

June

23 June

28 June

30 June

Unknown date

July

16 July

18 July

24 July

26 July

Unknown date

August

1 August

2 August

4 August

21 August

25 August

September

7 September

11 September

12 September

20 September

21 September

23 September

25 September

28 September

Unknown date

October

4 October

11 October

13 October

28 October

30 October

31 October

Unknown date

November

1 November

2 November

3 November

9 November

22 November

24 November

Unknown date

December

3 December

7 December

8 December

9 December

10 December

11 December

12 December

14 December

20 December

Unknown date

Unknown date

References

1798